Sándor Gelle (19 February 1914 – 1 May 1970) was a Hungarian sprint canoeist who competed in the late 1930s.

At the 1936 Summer Olympics in Berlin, he finished 12th in the K-2 10000 m event while being eliminated in the heats of the K-2 1000 m event.

References
Sándor Gelle's profile at Sports Reference.com
Mention of Sándor Gelle's death (page 19) 

1914 births
1970 deaths
Canoeists at the 1936 Summer Olympics
Hungarian male canoeists
Olympic canoeists of Hungary